Eois planetaria is a moth in the  family Geometridae. It is found in Peru.

The wingspan is about 27 mm. The forewings are reddish fawn, crossed from the base to the margin by a series of round white dots on the veins, representing the transverse lines. The hindwings are similar, but the basal area is not spotted and the spots towards the margin are all larger.

Subspecies
Eois planetaria planetaria
Eois planetaria albimacula (Dognin, 1911)

References

Moths described in 1907
Taxa named by William Warren (entomologist)
Eois
Moths of South America